Helminthophis frontalis is a species of nonvenomous snake in the family Anomalepididae. It is endemic to Costa Rica and Panama.

References

Anomalepididae
Reptiles described in 1860